Cormac, Bishop of Dunkeld (fl. x1114-1131x) is the earliest recorded Bishop of Dunkeld in the 12th century, although he was not the first bishop of Dunkeld. It is possible, that he was the first bishop of Dunkeld distinct from the abbot, but there is no evidence for this.  He appears in two rather doubtful charters of King Alexander I of Scotland, in several charters of King David I of Scotland and in the Gaelic notitiae on the Book of Deer, rendering a floruit of on or before the year 1114, to on or after the year 1131. The last source calls him "Cormac escob Dúno Callenn", Cormac bishop of Dunkeld".

He seems to have been succeeded by Gregoir.

References
Dowden, John, The Bishops of Scotland, ed. J. Maitland Thomson, (Glasgow, 1912), p. 47-8
Jackson, Kenneth H. (ed), The Gaelic Notes in the Book of Deer (The Osborn Bergin Memorial Lecture 1970), (Cambridge, 1972), p. 59
Lawrie, Sir Archibald, Early Scottish Charters Prior to A.D. 1153, (Glasgow, 1905), p. 283

External links
Dauvit Broun's list of 12th century Scottish Bishops

12th-century deaths
Medieval Gaels from Scotland
People from Perth and Kinross
12th-century Scottish Roman Catholic bishops
Year of birth unknown
Bishops of Dunkeld (pre-Reformation)